National Route 31 is a national highway in South Korea connects Gijang, Busan to Singosan, Anbyeon. Due to the separation of Korean peninsula, it de facto ends in Yanggu It established on 31 August 1971.

Main stopovers

South Korean parts 
Busan
 Gijang County 
Ulsan
 Ulju County - Nam District - Jung District - Buk District
North Gyeongsang Province
 Gyeongju - Pohang - Buk District (Pohang) - Gangdong-myeon (Gyeongju) - Buk District (Pohang) - Cheongsong County - Yeongyang County - Bonghwa County
Gangwon Province
 Taebaek - Yeongwol County - Pyeongchang County - Hongcheon County - Inje County - Yanggu County

North Korean parts 
Kangwon
 Suip-myeon, Yanggu - Hoeyang
North Hamgyeong
 Singosan-myeon, Anbyeon

Major intersections

 (■): Motorway
IS: Intersection, IC: Interchange

Busan

Ulsan

North Gyeongsang Province

Gangwon Province

References

31
Roads in Busan
Roads in Ulsan
Roads in North Gyeongsang
Roads in Gangwon